The Australian Tourist Trophy is a Confederation of Australian Motor Sport-sanctioned national motor racing title, contested between 1956 and 1979 by Sports Cars and, since 2007, by GT cars. The trophy is currently awarded to the outright winners of the Bathurst 12 Hour.

History
The title was awarded for the first time in 1956 and then annually from 1958 until the introduction by CAMS of an Australian Sports Car Championship for 1969. It was reinstituted in 1975, restricted for the first time to Production Sports Cars and contested over two heats rather than as a single race. In 1976, with the Production Sports Car class now contesting the Australian Sports Car Championship, the Australian Tourist Trophy once again became a contest for purpose built Group A Sports Cars until it was discontinued after the 1979 event.

After almost thirty years, the ATT title was again revived with the award going to the winner of the Sandown GT Classic in both 2007 and 2008. From 2009 until 2015 the Trophy was awarded to the driver accumulating the most outright championship points at specified rounds of the annual Australian GT Championship.

From 2017, the Australian Tourist Trophy has been awarded to the winners of the annual Bathurst 12 Hour event.

Winners

Multiple winners

By driver

By constructor

See also
 1936 Australian Tourist Trophy, for the unrelated motor race held at Phillip Island on 30 March 1936.
 Australian Tourist Trophy (for motorcycles)

References

Further reading
 Jim Shepherd, A History of Australian Motor Sport, 1980, pages 181–183

 
Recurring sporting events established in 1956
Auto racing trophies and awards
1956 establishments in Australia